Nahla is a feminine given name of multiple origins.

The name is of Arabic and African origin meaning first drink of water or water in the desert. In Sanskrit, it means stem, hollow reed. In Swahili and other languages spoken in countries of Africa, it means queen, lion and  successful woman. 

Another variant is Nala. This means 'gift' in Swahili. 

A descendant of the Arabic, "Naħla" means Bee in the Maltese language.

Notable people with the given name, or its variants, include:
Nahlah Ayed, Canadian journalist
Nahla Chahal, Iraqi-Lebanese journalist and activist
Nala Damajanti, snake charmer
Nahla Mahmoud, Sudanese-British writer and activist
Nahla El Fatiha Naili, Algerian sculptor
Nahla Ramadan, Egyptian weightlifter
Nahla Hussain al-Shaly, Iraqi women's rights promoter
Nahla Summers, social campaigner

Notable people with the surname include:
June-Rose Nala, South African trade unionist and academic

References

External links 
Babynames
Babynamesworld
meaning of Nahla in German

Feminine given names
Arabic feminine given names
African feminine given names
Indian feminine given names